Scleria pauciflora, known as few-flowered nutrush, papillose nut-sedge, and Carolina-whipgrass, is a plant in the sedge family (Cyperaceae) native to northern Mexico, the eastern United States, southern Canada, and Cuba. It is common across a broad stretch of the southeastern United States in many different habitat types, becoming rare at the northern end of its distribution.

Taxonomy
It was first formally described in 1805. Three varieties are accepted:
Scleria pauciflora var. caroliniana Alph.Wood
Scleria pauciflora var. curtissii (Britton) Fairey
Scleria pauciflora var. pauciflora

Conservation status
It is listed as endangered in Massachusetts and Michigan and as threatened in Ohio, Pennsylvania, and Rhode Island. In Canada, it is only known from Ontario, where it is listed as an S1 species (Critically Imperiled).

The variety Scleria pauciflora var. caroliniana is listed as endangered in Connecticut.

References

pauciflora
Flora of North America
Flora of Cuba
Flora without expected TNC conservation status